Ballynoe may refer to:

Northern Ireland
 Ballynoe, County Down
 Ballynoe townland, Co Antrim

Republic of Ireland
 Ballynoe, Kinnatalloon, County Cork; rural village
 Ballynoe, Great Island, County Cork; suburb of Cobh
 Ballynoe, Mallow, County Cork; village